Sher-Wood Hockey Inc. is a Canadian manufacturing company of ice hockey equipment. Sher-Wood also produced equipment under the Chimo brand name from 1977 to 1986. Since 2008, it has been the official supplier of game pucks to the NHL, taking over those duties upon its purchase of InGlasCo, which had served in that capacity prior to its purchase by Sher-Wood.

Sher-Wood's line of hockey products include sticks, protective elements (shoulder pads, shin guards, gloves, jockstraps). The company also produces a clothing line that includes compression garment, t-shirts, hoodies, jackets, caps, socks, and accessories (bags).

Products

Sticks 

Sher-Wood is one of the last ice hockey manufacturing companies to produce their own wooden sticks in Canada, the other companies having all offshored production to developing countries.  As of 2020, Sher-Wood still produces the classic 5030 Feather-Lite stick in Canada.  In late 2007, Sherwood-Drolet announced that they would move production of cheaper wooden sticks overseas to concentrate their North American plants on composite sticks.

References

External links 
 

Sporting goods manufacturers of Canada
Sporting goods brands
Companies based in Calgary
Manufacturing companies established in 1949
Canadian brands
Ice hockey brands